Marie-Hélène Peugeot-Roncoroni (born c. 1961) is a French heiress and businesswoman.

Early life
Marie-Hélène Peugeot was born circa 1961. Her father, Pierre Peugeot, served as the Chairman of Peugeot. She has three siblings, including Thierry Peugeot.

She graduated from Sciences Po.

Career
Peugeot-Roncoroni started her career in an accounting firm.

She later joined her family business, Peugeot, where she worked in "corporate finance, industrial relations and human resources." She served on the Supervisory Board of PSA Peugeot Citroën from 1999 to 2014. She has served as its Vice Chairman since 2014. She also serves on the Board of Directors of Société Foncière Financières et de Participations, the family investment company. Additionally, she serves as the Chief Operating Officer and Director of Etablissements Peugeot Frères, a Peugeot investment firm. She also serves on the Board of Directors of Simante SL.

She served on the Board of Directors of ONET S.A, a waste management and pest repellant company headquartered in Marseille. She also serves on the Boards of the Assurances Mutuelles de France, the French insurance company for civil servants, and ESSO, the French subsidiary of ExxonMobil.

Philanthropy
She serves on the board of trustees of the Institut Diderot, a French think tank.

Personal life
She is married to Mr Roncoroni. She has four children.

References

Living people
Sciences Po alumni
French corporate directors
PSA Group people
21st-century French businesswomen
21st-century French businesspeople
Women corporate directors
Year of birth missing (living people)